Mmabana Stadium is a multi-use stadium in Thaba 'Nchu, Free State, South Africa.  It is currently used mostly for football matches and is the home ground of Mangaung City.

Sports venues in the Free State (province)
Soccer venues in South Africa
Mangaung